Orlanda may refer to:

People 
Orlanda Amarílis (1924–2014), Cape Verdean author
Orlanda Maria Duarte Santos Ferreira, Cape Verdean politician
Orlanda Velez Isidro (born 1973), Portuguese soprano

Ships 
, a German cargo ship in service 1920-45

See also 
 Orlando (disambiguation)